Gerhard Wanner (born 1942 in Innsbruck) is an Austrian mathematician.

Education and career
Wanner grew up in Seefeld in Tirol and studied mathematics at the University of Innsbruck, where he received his doctorate in 1965 with advisor Wolfgang Gröbner and dissertation Ein Beitrag zur numerischen Behandlung von Randwertproblemen gewöhnlicher Differentialgleichungen (A contribution to the numerical treatment of boundary value problems of ordinary differential equations). He taught in Innsbruck and from 1973 at the University of Geneva.

Wanner's research deals with numerical analysis of ordinary differential equations (about which he wrote a two-volume monograph with Ernst Hairer). Wanner is the co-author of an analysis undergraduate textbook and a geometry undergraduate textbook, both of which give historically oriented explanations of mathematics.

In 2003 he was awarded, jointly with Ernst Hairer, the Peter Henrici Prize. In 2015 Wanner received SIAM's George Pólya Prize for Mathematical Exposition.

He was president of the Swiss Mathematical Society from 1998 to 1999.

Selected publications

Articles

Books
 with Ernst Hairer: 
 
 
 with Alexander Ostermann: Geometry by Its History. Springer, Berlin/Heidelberg 2012, .
 with Ernst Hairer and Christian Lubich:  2nd edition. Springer, Berlin/Heidelberg 2010, . pbk reprint
 with Ernst Hairer and Sylvert Nørsett:   3rd corrected printing. Springer, Berlin/Heidelberg 2009, .
 with Ernst Hairer and Sylvert Nørsett:  2nd edition. Springer, Berlin/Heidelberg 1996, . 2013 pbk reprint
 Integration gewöhnlicher Differentialgleichungen: Lie-Reihen (mit Programmen), Runge-Kutta-Methoden. BI-Hochschultaschenbücher. Bibliographisches Institut, Mannheim/Zürich 1969.

References

External links
Homepage

Austrian mathematicians
University of Innsbruck alumni
Academic staff of the University of Geneva
1942 births
Living people
Austrian expatriates in Switzerland